Lipnic is a commune in Ocnița District, Moldova. It is composed of two villages, Lipnic and Paustova. 

On 20 August 1470, at Lipnic (Lipinţi) was famous Battle of Lipnic, the river, where the Moldavian military, led by Stephen the Great, defeated the armies of the Crimean Khanate led by Murtada. After the fight Khan son and his brother Eminec are captured and taken as prisoners.

References

Communes of Ocnița District